King Henry VIII Grammar School, Abergavenny, Monmouthshire was one of a series of schools founded during the Reformation in England and Wales in 1542 from property seized from monasteries and religious congregations. In this case, a school which had been associated with the local Priory Church was administered by the (now Protestant) state instead.

The school provided free education to boys in the local area who passed an entrance examination.
The school motto was "Ut Prosim" ("That I may be of service") and school colours were red and blue.
The school was divided into two houses, Oppidan and Rustican, from the Latin for Town and Country.
 
The school was merged with the local Girls' High School in 1963 and later became a comprehensive school when selection at 11 was abolished. The school is now operating as King Henry VIII School Abergavenny.

A former pupil of the school, David Lewis, was the first Principal of Jesus College, Oxford. Amongst other distinguished pupils, well-known writer and critic Raymond Williams gave a fictionalised account of his time there in the novel "Border Country"

External links 
 Timeline - Former Pupils Association
 King Henry VIII School, Abergavenny - archaeological desk-based assessment 
 
 British Listed Buildings.co.uk - Former King Henry VIII Grammar School, Abergavenny
 British History Online: Topographical Dictionary, Lewis, 1845: Abergavenny
 Abergavenny Chronicle: Multi-million pound rebuild of King Henry VIII confirmed by Monmouthshire County Council. Christopher Gage, 22 Nov 2017

1542 establishments in Wales
Educational institutions established in the 1540s
Defunct schools in Monmouthshire
Abergavenny
Grammar schools in Wales